Chal Dhar Pakad is a Marathi sports drama film released on 6 December 2010. Produced by Neeta Laad and directed by Aatmaram Dharne, the film stars Nirmiti Sawant, Nagesh Bhosle, Priya Berde, Teja Devkar, and Megha Ghadge. The film's music is by Devidas Parab.

The films is about a woman's fight for self-respect and rights.

Plot
Somewhere in Maharashtra is Vaitagwadi, a small lost village. The village is under serious financial issues, it has a school but no chalks for the black board, there is a Dispensary but no doctors, villagers have land but in the name of Bhujangrao Patil.

Character named Bhujangrao Patil is very passionate about the game of Kabaddi, for which the entire village is under the sage of fear. If any one dares to go against him or refuses to obey his orders, Bhujangrao Patil declares a game of Kabaddi to an ill-fated result.

Bhujangrao Patil's wife Komal used to have the slimmest body before she got married. Today, Bhujangrao has replaced Komal with Champa as he hates even the sight of his obese wife. To regain her self-respect and her rights, Komal takes a vow to challenge and defeat Bhujangrao in the game he is so proud of, Kabaddi.

Cast
 Nirmiti Sawant
 Nagesh Bhosle
 Priya Berde
 Teja Devkar
 Megha Ghadge
 Sanjay Kasbekar
 Hemlata Bane

Crew
Director - Aatmaram Dharne
Producer - Neeta Laad
Cinematographer - Shyam Chauhan
Art Director - Amar More
Music Director - Devidas Parab
Lyricist - Subod Pawar

Soundtrack
The music has been directed by Devidas Parab, while the lyrics have been provided by Subod Pawar.

Track listing

References

External links 
  Cast Details - gomolo.com
  Songs - smashits.com
  Songs - dhingana.com

2010 films
2010s Marathi-language films